Sirak may refer to:

People 
Fantaye Sirak (born 1963), Ethiopian middle-distance runner
Sirak M. Sabahat (born 1981), Israeli actor

Places 
Sirak, Chaharmahal and Bakhtiari, a village in Iran
Sirak, East Azerbaijan, a village in Iran
Sirak, Lorestan, a village in Iran

Other uses 
 Sirak language, a language also known as Nafi

See also 
Širak (disambiguation)